The 1st Alabama Cavalry Regiment served in the Confederate Army during the American Civil War.

Service
The 1st Alabama Cavalry Regiment was raised at Montgomery, Alabama, in November 1861.

Ordered to Tennessee, the regiment fought at the Battle of Shiloh in April 1862. It then fought at the Battle of Boonville, Mississippi, and Blackland. In Kentucky with General Joseph Wheeler, it was engaged at the Battle of Perryville in October 1862. Returning to middle Tennessee, the regiment lost many men at the Second Battle of Murfreesboro, Battle of Stones River in December 1862 and January 1863. On the retreat to Tullahoma and Chattanooga, it again lost many men at Duck River. In September 1863, the regiment fought at the Battle of Chickamauga. In east Tennessee with Longstreet, it fought at Clinton, Knoxville, and Mossy Creek. It was part of the force on the Sequatchee raid, fought at Dandridge. During Sherman's Atlanta Campaign, the regiment harassed the enemy. Again, in Tennessee, it fought at Waynesboro, and at Fiddler's Pond. Then, it fought at Kilpatrick, Averysboro, and Bentonville.

Near Raleigh, North Carolina, a few days before Lee's surrender, the regiment drove back the enemy. It then surrendered as part of William W. Allen's division at Salisbury, North Carolina, about 150 strong.

Commanders
Colonel James Holt Clanton
Colonel William W. Allen

See also
Alabama Civil War Confederate Units
Alabama in the American Civil War

Notes

References
The Civil War Archive
Confederate Regimental Histories
First Alabama Cavalry Regiment

Units and formations of the Confederate States Army from Alabama
1861 establishments in Alabama
Military units and formations established in 1861